Yajaman is a 1993 Indian Tamil-language drama film written and directed by R. V. Udayakumar. It stars Rajinikanth and Meena. The film was produced by M. Saravanan, M. S. Guhan and M. Subrahmaniam of AVM Productions. It was released on 18 February 1993. The film was commercially successful and had a 175-day theatrical run.

Plot 

Kandhavelu Vaanavarayan is a feudal chieftain, adored and respected by the people of his village near Pollachi. He lives with his grandparents. Following his advice, they abstain from voting in the elections and instead, pool the money given by the candidates to get themselves some basic amenities. Vallavaraayan is his archenemy. Their enmity is further sharpened when Vaanavarayan wins the hand of Vaitheeswari, whom Vallavaraayan had also wished to wed. Vallavaraayan then convinces the priest of the village temple to mix poison in the holy water that Vaitheeswari drinks. As a result, she becomes incapable of conceiving a baby. But surprisingly, Vaitheeswari soon becomes pregnant, though she has pretended with the help of the mid-wife, to do so to uphold her husband's honour. However, she takes poison and kills herself during the Seemantham celebration, unable to bear the grief of being incapable of giving her husband a child and on her deathbed makes Vaanavarayan swear to take Ponni as his wife. Vaanavarayan however refuses until Ponni agrees to marry Sembattai- Vallavarayan's henchman-who abandons her to Vallavarayan's vice. Infuriated, Vaanavarayan attacks Vallavarayan, but spares his life after giving him a sermon on how to win the hearts of people.

Cast 
Rajinikanth as Kanthavelu Vaanavarayan
Meena as Vaitheswari
Aishwarya as Ponni
Napoleon as Vallavarayan
M. N. Nambiar as Vaanavarayan's grandfather
Manorama as Akilandeswari, Vaanavarayan's grandmother
Goundamani as Vellaiyangiri, a worker in Vaanavarayan's house
Senthil as Azhagiri, Vellaiyangiri's half-brother and rival, a worker in Vaitheeswari's house
Vijayakumar as Vaitheswari's father
S. N. Lakshmi as the village nurse
Thalapathy Dinesh as Sembattai
Rajesh Babu as Vallavarayan's younger brother
Sandhya as Vallavarayan's wife
M. Varalakshmi as Vaitheswari's mother
Peeli Sivam as Ponni's father

Production 
After the success of Chinna Gounder (1992), director R. V. Udayakumar was approached by various producers but he was unsure as to who should play the part of the hero for his next film. Subsequently, he decided to cast Rajinikanth as the hero for his next film. Rajinikanth agreed to act under the direction of Udayakumar. The director expressed his interest to make this film for AVM Productions. Initially, a different script titled Jilla Collector was narrated, but Udaykumar subsequently opted to film a different script altogether, since M. Saravanan of AVM felt that the original script might go over budget. Meena was selected as the heroine. Rajinikanth was initially reluctant to have her as the heroine because she had appeared as a child artist for his film Anbulla Rajinikanth and he felt that his fans might not readily accept this pairing. But he eventually agreed to have Meena play the part. Yajaman was Rajinikanth's 141st film and his 8th collaboration with AVM Productions. One of the filming locations was Samathur Jamindar Ramaraja Vanavarayar Palace at Pollachi while filming was also held at Andhra.

Soundtrack 
The music was composed by Ilaiyaraaja. Except for the song "Adi Raakumuthu" which was penned by Vaali, all other songs were penned by Udayakumar himself. Many of the songs are set in Carnatic ragas; "Aalappol Velappol" is set in Sankarabharanam, "Yajaman Kaladi" is in Madhyamavati, "Nilave Mugam Kaattu" and "Oru Naalum" are set in Sindhubhairavi.

Release and reception 
Yajaman was released on 18 February 1993. When the film was released, it initially received unfavorable reception and did not do well in some areas. When Saravanan saw a letter written by Thilagavathi who reviewed the film, he used this letter as an advertisement for the film which led to the increase in collection. According to Saravanan, despite the fans of Rajinikanth not liking the film, it picked up due to the support of general public.

Malini Mannath of The Indian Express wrote, "Yajaman is a well meant film from AVM and from director Udayakumar". K. Vijiyan of New Straits Times wrote, "The film begins well but gets bogged down after the interval and the large number of songs do not help matters". C. R. K. of Kalki praised the performances of artistes. At the 14th Cinema Express Awards, S. P. Balasubrahmanyam won the Best Playback Singer award.

Legacy 
Chinna Gounder and Yajaman started the trend of portrayals of village chieftain in Tamil films. Director Rajmohan directed a film titled Vanavarayan Vallavarayan (2014) named after Rajinikanth and Napoleon's characters. Dhanapal Padmanabhan who directed Krishnaveni Panjaalai (2012), rated Yajaman "as the film that best captured the village flavour and beauty of Pollachi".

References

Bibliography

External links 

1990s Tamil-language films
1993 drama films
1993 films
AVM Productions films
Films directed by R. V. Udayakumar
Films scored by Ilaiyaraaja
Indian drama films